Hotell Pepparkaka (Hotel Gingerbread) was the 1995 edition of Sveriges Radio's Christmas Calendar.

Plot
Out in the fairy tale-forest stands Hotel Gingerbread, made out of gingerbread and icing. Twenty-four rooms are available for rent, and each room contains a fairytale secret. The hotel's proprietors are Hansel and Gretel.

References
 

1995 radio programme debuts
1995 radio programme endings
Fictional hotels
Sveriges Radio's Christmas Calendar